Death of a Cheerleader is an album by  Pom Pom Squad.

Background
Musically, Berrin pulled inspiration from riot grrrl bands, 60's girl groups, Billie Holiday, and Motown. The title of "Second That" is a nod to the Smokey Robinson hit, "I Second That Emotion."

Berrin cited feelings of isolation as a person of color in the music industry as an inspiration for Death of a Cheerleader, stating that "I wanted to define myself in different terms than other people defined me." Berrin also took inspiration from the realization that she is queer, describing many of the songs as having been inspired by someone who taught her "a lot about my queerness and the space that it occupies inside of me." As she describes in an interview for The Village Voice:

Critical reception

Upon its release, Death of a Cheerleader received generally positive reviews from music critics. At Metacritic, which assigns a normalized rating out of 100 to reviews from critics, the album received an average score of 87, which indicates "universal acclaim", based on 7 reviews.

Rachel Saywitz in The Line of Best Fit claims the Pom Pom Squad "subvert expectations, all the while converting the pain points of adolescence and the boredom of high school suburbia into whimsical fantasy."

In a review published in Consequence, Paolo Ragusa writes that "Mia Berrin solidifies her place among the newest class of indie stalwart songwriters, carving out this space in a fearless and vulnerable way."

"Equally indebted to pioneering girl groups as well as her punk heroes, the album is a fiery and compelling—albeit slightly uneven—exploration of love, anger, and coming-of-age," writes Abby Jones for Pitchfork.

Accolades

Track listing
All tracks are written by Mia Berrin, except where noted.

Personnel
 Mia Berrin – vocals
 Mari Alé Figeman  – bass
 Shelby Keller – drums and percussion
 Alex Mercuri – lead guitar
 Camellia Hartman – string arrangement for "Forever" and "Be Good"

References

2021 debut albums
City Slang albums
Indie rock albums by American artists